Nagupalli is a village in Dammapeta mandal which in Khammam district which is in Telangana state.
Population of Nagupalli is approximately 7000. Main livelihood for the people is farming.

Villages in Khammam district